The Rialto Hotel, known since 1980 as the Hailey Hotel, is a historic hotel in Hailey, Idaho, United States. It was a boarding house and cafe built in 1934. In now hosts a bar and, on its upper floor, a radio station, KSKI-FM.

It was listed on the National Register of Historic Places in 2009.

References

Buildings and structures in Blaine County, Idaho
Hotel buildings completed in 1934
Hotel buildings on the National Register of Historic Places in Idaho
National Register of Historic Places in Blaine County, Idaho
1934 establishments in Idaho